Jasper Eldred Kai Smith-Gordon (born 9 September 2002) is a British artistic gymnast. In 2019, he won the bronze medal in the vault event at the 2019 Junior World Artistic Gymnastics Championships held in Győr, Hungary.

Smith-Gordon's parents are Kumi Suzuki and Lionel George Eldred Smith-Gordon, heir apparent of the Smith-Gordon Baronetcy.

References

External links 
 

Living people
2002 births
Place of birth missing (living people)
British male artistic gymnasts
Medalists at the Junior World Artistic Gymnastics Championships
21st-century British people